The applied arts are all the arts that apply design and decoration to everyday and essentially practical objects in order to make them aesthetically pleasing. The term is used in distinction to the fine arts, which are those that produce objects with no practical use, whose only purpose is to be beautiful or stimulate the intellect in some way. In practice, the two often overlap.  Applied arts largely overlap with decorative arts, and the modern making of applied art is usually called design.

Examples of applied arts are:
 Industrial design – mass-produced objects.
 Sculpture – also counted as a fine art.
 Architecture – also counted as a fine art.
 Crafts – also counted as a fine art.
 Ceramic art
 Automotive design
 Fashion design
 Calligraphy
 Interior design
 Graphic design
 Cartographic (map) design

Movements
Art movements that mostly operated in the applied arts include the following.  In addition, major artistic styles such as Neoclassicism, Gothic and others cover both the fine and applied or decorative arts. 
 Art Nouveau 
 Art Deco
 Arts and Crafts Movement
 Bauhaus
 Productivism

Museums of Applied Arts
 Bauhaus Archive
 Die Neue Sammlung, Germany
 Leipzig Museum of Applied Arts, Germany
 Martin-Gropius-Bau
 Museum of Applied Arts (Belgrade), Serbia
 Museum of Arts and Crafts, Zagreb
 Museum of Applied Arts (Budapest), Hungary
 Museum für angewandte Kunst Frankfurt, Germany
 Museum für Angewandte Kunst (Cologne), Germany
 Museum für angewandte Kunst Wien, Austria
 Museum of Contemporary Design and Applied Arts (MUDAC), Lausanne, Switzerland
 National Folk Decorative Art Museum, Kyiv, Ukraine
 Powerhouse Museum, Sydney
 Stieglitz Museum of Applied Arts (Saint Petersburg), Russia
 Prague Museum of Decorative Arts, Czech Republic
 Victoria and Albert Museum, London
 Wolfsonian-FIU, Miami Beach, Florida

See also

 Art for art's sake
 Decorative arts  
 Design museum
 Fine art
 Sculpture
 Painting

References

Further reading
Dormer, Peter (ed.), The Culture of Craft, 1997, Manchester University Press, 9780719046186, google books

Design
Decorative arts
Crafts